Towaninny is a locality in the Victoria, Australia, located approximately 35 km from Wycheproof, Victoria.

Towaninnie (sic) Post Office opened on 1 October 1864 and closed in 1953. The pastoral run here was known as Towaninnie, but when the area was surveyed and gazetted as a parish in 1871 the spelling was Towaninny.

See also
List of places in Victoria (Australia) named from pastoral runs

References

Towns in Victoria (Australia)